Arruns, also spelled Aruns, is an Etruscan praenomen, thought to mean "prince."  Various figures in Roman history were known by this name, including:

Arruns Porsena, son of Lars Porsena, the legendary king of Clusium.
Arruns Tarquinius (son of Demaratus), the grandfather of Lucius Tarquinius Collatinus, one of the first Roman consuls in 509 BC;
Arruns Tarquinius (Egerius), the father of Lucius Tarquinius Collatinus;
Arruns Tarquinius (brother of Tarquin the Proud), murdered by his wife, Tullia, who subsequently married his brother, Lucius, the seventh and last King of Rome;
Arruns Tarquinius (son of Tarquin the Proud), slain in battle with Lucius Junius Brutus, colleague of Tarquinius Collatinus.